A legal debate is a discussion between lawyers, legal academics, jurists, politicians, and others who might have an interest or expertise in the law, about a particular legal issue.

Overview 
Legal debates can take many forms, and do not necessarily need to be face-to-face debates.  Most legal debates take place on paper—judges within a court, for example, might debate each other most effectively when the court publishes a decision.  Legal debates include (but are not limited to) the following:

Debates between judges.  These debates, as well, will often occur face to face during judicial conferences, but they find their most prominent voice in written opinions.  Splintered U.S. Supreme Court decisions present a prominent example.  Antonin Scalia's dissents with the majority epitomize the nature of judicial legal debate—a debate that often centers around the proper means of interpreting federal statutes or the Constitution.
Debate between politicians.  An example of this debate is that between the President of the United States and the United States Congress over the ability of the executive power to issue clandestine wiretaps without seeking a warrant.  The legal debate at issue is the scope of executive power vis-a-vis the other branches of government.
General debate within society.  Societies always debate the legal order.  The process of electing politicians and lobbying is a form of legal debate: the majority tends to become part of a coalition that agrees on the laws that will be implemented.

Contemporary issues in legal debates 
Debates in Western societies often follow broad themes, including

The balance between state power and civil liberties
The proper breadth of civil liberties relative to social norms and moral expectations

In the United States, legal debates over the past decade have concerned the following important topics:

The right to privacy, including the right to have an abortion
The balance between civil rights and the need for greater security after September 11, 2001
The proper method of interpreting the Constitution
Affirmative Action
Welfare reform#
The right to a child

In general, the variety of debates—ranging from basic social policy to grander theory about constitutional design and democratic theory—suggests that legal debates overlap with several other social institutions and expectations.

References

See also 

Constitutional law
Jurisprudence
United States Supreme Court

Jurisprudence
Debate types
Legal disputes
Legal education
Practice of law
Legal research